Heteropsis perspicua, the eyed bush brown, swamp patroller or marsh patroller, is a butterfly of the family Nymphalidae. It is native to eastern and southern Africa, but a western subspecies is present in Cameroon.

Range
It is found in KwaZulu-Natal, Eswatini, Transvaal, Mozambique, from Zimbabwe to Kenya, in eastern Zaire and Tanzania.

Description
The wingspan is 38–43 mm for males and 42–48 mm for females. Adults are on wing year-round. The wet-season form is on wing in spring and summer and the dry-season form in autumn and winter.

Food plants
The larvae feed on various Poaceae species, including Ehrharta erecta, Panicum maximum and Pennisetum clandestinum.

Subspecies
Heteropsis perspicua perspicua (Ethiopia, Sudan, Uganda, Kenya, DRC, Rwanda, Burundi, Tanzania, Zambia, Malawi, Mozambique, Zimbabwe, northern Namibia, South Africa, Eswatini)
Heteropsis perspicua camerounica (Kielland, 1994) (northern Cameroon)

References

Elymniini
Butterflies described in 1873
Butterflies of Africa
Taxa named by Roland Trimen